Coleophora vulnerariae is a moth of the family Coleophoridae. It is found from Norway and Sweden to the Iberian Peninsula, Italy and Greece and from Great Britain to the Baltic states, Romania and Bulgaria. It is also found in southern Russia.

The wingspan is 12–18 mm. Adults are on wing in June and July.

The larvae feed within seedpods of kidney vetch (Anthyllis vulneraria) in a movable case.

References

vulnerariae
Moths described in 1839
Moths of Europe
Taxa named by Philipp Christoph Zeller